The giant honeycomb oyster (Hyotissa hyotis) is a very large saltwater oyster, a marine bivalve mollusk.

Species in this family are known as honeycomb oysters or "foam oysters" because under magnification, their shell structure is foam-like.

Like most bivalves, the giant honeycomb oyster is a filter feeder.

Habitat and range 
Its native range is in deeper water in the Indo-Pacific Ocean. It has however also been found recently as an accidentally introduced species in the Florida Keys.

Bibliography 
 Paula M. Mikkelsen and Rudiger Bieler, 2008, Seashells of Southern Florida: Living Marine mollusks of the Florida Keys and adjacent regions, Princeton University Press, Princeton and Oxford,

References

Gryphaeidae
Molluscs described in 1758
Taxa named by Carl Linnaeus